The Embassy of Armenia in London is the diplomatic mission of Armenia to the United Kingdom. Diplomatic relations between the two countries were established in 1992. The current Ambassador of Armenia to the United Kingdom is Varuzhan Nersesyan.

Gallery

See also 

 Armenia–United Kingdom relations
 Foreign relations of Armenia
 List of diplomatic missions of Armenia

References

External links
 Official site

Armenia
Diplomatic missions of Armenia
Armenia–United Kingdom relations
Buildings and structures in the Royal Borough of Kensington and Chelsea
South Kensington